The Silverback Open Championships has been an international prize money breaking competition (b-boying and b-girling), with five editions held to date in Philadelphia, Pennsylvania, 2014 through 2018.  Funded by Silverback Bboy Events, which supports the competitive breaking community philanthropically and through sponsorships, the Silverback Open Championships has been regarded as one of the premier International B-Boy Championships held every year it has been featured, with the most recent edition including 850 competitors from 50 countries. Silverback Open prize money pools have exceeded $100,000, and the event has attracted an international social media following accumulating millions of views.  The Silverback Open event has been part of the Urban Dance & Educational Foundation's Pro Breaking Tour and Undisputed's World B-boy Series. The event has featured of many of the best and most well-known b-boys and b-girls around the world and has received praise throughout the breaking community for the high level of competition and for providing a warm welcome to guests and competitors alike.

Silverback Open Championships 1-on-1 B-Boy results

Silverback Open Championships 3 vs 3 results

Silverback Open Championships 1-on-1 B-Girl results

2018

2018 1-on-1 Solo Battle result

2018 3 vs 3 Crew Battle result

Winning b-boys:  Vero,  Menno, and  Hong 10.

2017

2017 1-on-1 Solo Battle result

2017 3 vs 3 Crew Battle result

Winning b-boys:  Wing,  Skim, and  Hong 10.

2016
The Silverback Open Championships ’16 took place on October 8 and 9 2016 at the YSC Sports complex outside of Philadelphia as part of the 2016 Pro Breaking Tour's Champions Series. The event was organized by Silverback Bboy Events and paid $100,000 in cash prize money, plus trips for several winners to the Freestyle Session World Finals in Los Angeles, as well as a trip to compete at Undisputed in Prague, Czech Republic for the 1-on-1 Open winner. A panel of seven judged the 1-on-1 Open, the 3-on-3 Open and the 1-on-1 Bgirl with two alternates in case a judge happened to be in the same crew as a competitor. The preliminary battles expanded the judging panel to five judges for each cypher.

2016 1-on-1 Solo Battle result

2016 3 vs 3 Crew Battle result

Winning b-boys:  Kuzya,  Sunni, and  Pocket.

2015
The Silverback Open Championships 2015 took place on October 10 and 11 2015 at the YSC Sports complex outside of Philadelphia as part of the 2015 Pro Breaking Tours Champions Series. The event was organized by Silverback Bboy Events and paid $90,150 in cash prize money, plus trips for several winners to the Freestyle Session World Finals in Los Angeles, as well as a trip to compete at Undisputed in Marseille, France for the 1-on-1 Open winner. The 1-on-1 Open and 1-on-1 B-girl winners also received a Mackie Freeplay Portable PA Speaker with the optional lithium ion battery allowing for 10 hours of continuous music. A panel of seven judged the 1-on-1 Open, the 3-on-3 Open and the 1-on-1 B-girl with two alternates in case a judge happens to be in the same crew as a competitor.  The preliminary battles expanded the judging panel to five judges for each cypher.

2015 1-on-1 Solo Battle result

Victor earned the fifth bid to Undisputed at the end of the 2015 year by winning Silverback Open Championships 2015.

2015 3 vs 3 Crew Battle result

7 Commandoz participating b-boys:  Hong 10,  Wing, and  Skim.

2014
The Silverback Open Championships ’14 took place on October 11 and 12 2014 at the YSC Sports complex outside of Philadelphia as part of the 2014 Pro Breaking Tours Champions Series.  The event was organized by organized by Silverback Bboy Events and paid $58,400 in cash prize money, a $10,000 Breitling watch, plus trips for several winners to the Freestyle Session World Final's in San Diego. A panel of seven judged the Open 1-on-1, the Open 3-on-3 and the B-girl 1-v-1.

2014 1-on-1 Solo Battle result

2014 3 vs 3 Crew Battle result

Squadron participating b-boys:  Nasty Ray,  Moy, and  Prada G.

References

External links
 Silverback Open
 Pro Breaking Tour
 UDEF

Breakdance
Street dance competitions